Mihailovca is a village in Cimișlia District, Moldova.

References

Villages of Cimișlia District